L'Arlésienne may refer to:

"L'Arlésienne" (short story), an 1869 short story by Alphonse Daudet, later turned into a play
L'Arlésienne (Bizet), musical works based on Georges Bizet's incidental music to Alphonse Daudet's play of the same name
L'Arlésienne, a 1974 ballet choreographed by Roland Petit to the music of Georges Bizet
L'Arlésienne (painting), an 1888–1890 series of six paintings by Vincent van Gogh
L'Arlésienne (1908 film), a French drama film
L'Arlésienne (1942 film), a French drama film

See also
L'arlesiana, an 1897 opera by Francisco Cilea